The slope conger (Ariosoma prorigerum), also known as the black-fin conger, is an eel in the family Congridae (conger/garden eels). It was described by Charles Henry Gilbert in 1891, originally under the genus Ophisoma. It is a marine, deep water-dwelling eel which is known from the southeastern and eastern central Pacific Ocean, including Colombia, Ecuador, Costa Rica, Honduras, El Salvador, Mexico, Guatemala, Nicaragua, Panama, and Peru. It is known to dwell at a depth range of 380–740 metres, and inhabits substrates.

Due to its widespread distribution, lack of known threats, and lack of observed population declines, the IUCN redlist currently lists the slope conger as Least Concern. There is some dispute as to whether Ariosoma or Ophisoma is the valid genus for the species.

References

Ariosoma
Taxa named by Charles Henry Gilbert
Fish described in 1891